The 1928 Clemson Tigers football team represented Clemson College—now known as Clemson University—as a member of the Southern Conference (SoCon) during the 1928 college football season. Led by second-year head coach Josh Cody, the Tigers compiled an overall record of 8–3 with a mark of 4–2 in conference play, tying for seventh place in the SoCon.

Captain O. K. Pressley starred in the rivalry game with South Carolina, recording four tackles for a loss in a row despite a hand injury. He was the first Clemson Tiger to make any All-America team when he was selected third-team All-America at season's end.

Schedule

References

Clemson
Clemson Tigers football seasons
Clemson Tigers football